Peapack-Gladstone (also written as Peapack and Gladstone) is a borough in Somerset County in the U.S. state of  New Jersey. As of the 2010 Census, the borough's population was 2,582, reflecting an increase of 149 (+6.1%) from the 2,433 counted in the 2000 Census, which had in turn increased by 322 (+15.3%) from the 2,111 counted in the 1990 Census. 

Peapack-Gladstone was incorporated as a borough by an act of the New Jersey Legislature on March 28, 1912, from portions of Bedminster, subject to the results of a referendum held on April 23, 1912. It is part of the New York metropolitan area, as well as the larger New York–Newark–Bridgeport, NY-NJ-CT-PA Combined Statistical Area and it is located within the Raritan Valley region.

Peapack is believed to have been derived from "Peapackton,” a Lenape Native American term meaning "marriage of the waters", a reference to the confluence of the Peapack Brook and Raritan River in the area. Gladstone was named in honor of William Ewart Gladstone, who served as British Prime Minister several times between 1868 and 1894. In operation until the mid-1930s, the Moses Craig lime kiln is located at the center of Peapack.

Geography

According to the United States Census Bureau, the borough had a total area of 5.80 square miles (15.03 km2), including 5.73 square miles (14.85 km2) of land and 0.07 square miles (0.18 km2) of water (1.21%).

Unincorporated communities, localities and place names located partially or completely within the township include Gladstone, Peapack and Ravine Lake.

The borough borders Bedminster to the southwest, Bernardsville to the east and Far Hills to the southeast in Somerset County; and Chester Township to the northwest and Mendham Township to the northeast in Morris County.

Demographics

Census 2010

The Census Bureau's 2006–2010 American Community Survey showed that (in 2010 inflation-adjusted dollars) median household income was $123,875 (with a margin of error of +/− $16,668) and the median family income was $145,333 (+/− $23,674). Males had a median income of $86,379 (+/− $16,014) versus $60,833 (+/− $16,980) for females. The per capita income for the borough was $61,841 (+/− $12,910). About none of families and 2.3% of the population were below the poverty line, including none of those under age 18 and 2.2% of those age 65 or over.

Census 2000

As of the 2000 United States Census there were 2,433 people, 840 households, and 646 families residing in the borough. The population density was 419.5 people per square mile (162.0/km2). There were 871 housing units at an average density of 150.2 per square mile (58.0/km2). The racial makeup of the borough was 94.45% white, 3.12% African American, 0.08% Native American, 1.23% Asian, 0.70% from other races, and 0.41% from two or more races. Hispanic or Latino of any race were 3.78% of the population.

There were 840 households, out of which 37.1% had children under the age of 18 living with them, 69.5% were married couples living together, 5.5% had a female householder with no husband present, and 23.0% were non-families. 18.1% of all households were made up of individuals, and 8.5% had someone living alone who was 65 years of age or older. The average household size was 2.71 and the average family size was 3.11.

In the borough the population was spread out, with 26.0% under the age of 18, 5.5% from 18 to 24, 30.1% from 25 to 44, 26.3% from 45 to 64, and 12.2% who were 65 years of age or older. The median age was 40 years. For every 100 females, there were 97.8 males. For every 100 females age 18 and over, there were 97.0 males.

The median income for a household in the borough was $99,499, and the median income for a family was $118,770. Males had a median income of $62,446 versus $46,500 for females. The per capita income for the borough was $56,542. About 1.9% of families and 4.2% of the population were below the poverty line, including 2.1% of those under age 18 and 4.1% of those age 65 or over.

Economy
The Peapack-Gladstone Bank was established on September 21, 1921, originally named the Peapack-Gladstone Trust Company. It operates as the local bank for the greater region, specializing in private banking and wealth management, and is publicly traded under NASDAQ with the ticker symbol PGC.

Arts and culture
Points of interest in the borough include:
 The Gladstone train station building was re-labeled "Boston," and its surroundings were supplied with peat-moss dirt, period vehicles and extras in Victorian dress, for a 1962 movie shoot. In the Oscar-winning film The Miracle Worker, Anne Bancroft in the role of Annie Sullivan boards a long-distance steam train there to take the job as Helen Keller's teacher.

The borough was a major shooting location of the CBS soap opera Guiding Light from 2007 until the show's conclusion in 2009.

Sports
Horseback riding is very popular throughout the area. The United States Equestrian Team has its home in Gladstone.

Hamilton Farm Golf Club has been the site of the Sybase Match Play Championship since its inception in 2010, which is the only match play format event on the LPGA Tour.

The borough is home to Stronghold Soccer Club, which plays its matches at Mount St. John's on the grounds of Montgomery Academy.

Municipal services

Emergency services
Policing is provided by the Peapack and Gladstone Police Department, which has a staff of nine officers and a Chief.

Fire service has been provided since 1905 by the all-volunteer Peapack and Gladstone Volunteer Fire Company, known in the Somerset County Radio System as "51 Fire". The department operates out of the fire station located on Dewey Avenue. The department retired a 1988 Pierce Lance in 2010 after many years of service.

Emergency medical services are provided by the non-profit, all-volunteer Peapack Gladstone First Aid Squad, known as "51 Rescue", based at a newly renovated location on St. Lukes Avenue. The Squad operates 2007 and 2005 Ford MedTec ambulances. Retired in 2007 was a 1993 Ford MedTec ambulance. The Squad provides around-the-clock service at no cost to its patients.

Emergency medical services are bolstered by Mobile Intensive Care Units (MICU) with paramedics from the local hospitals of Morristown Medical Center (also a regional trauma center) in Morristown and from Robert Wood Johnson University Hospital Somerset (formerly Somerset Medical Center) in Somerville. In the event of a serious trauma accident, as occurs occasionally on Route 206 which runs through the borough, the services of the New Jersey State Police North Shock Trauma Air Rescue (NorthSTAR), which is based in neighboring Bedminster, may be called upon to provide medical evacuation to a trauma center.

Public works
The Peapack-Gladstone Department of Public Works (DPW) is responsible for maintenance for the borough's buildings, snow removal, sewer inspection, as well as the general maintenance of roads and other services.

Government

Local government
Peapack-Gladstone is governed under the Borough form of New Jersey municipal government, which is used in 218 municipalities (of the 564) statewide, making it the most common form of government in New Jersey. The governing body is comprised of the Mayor and the Borough Council, with all positions elected at-large on a partisan basis as part of the November general election. The Mayor is elected directly by the voters to a four-year term of office. The Borough Council is comprised of six members elected to serve three-year terms on a staggered basis, with two seats coming up for election each year in a three-year cycle. The Borough form of government used by Peapack-Gladstone is a "weak mayor / strong council" government in which council members act as the legislative body with the mayor presiding at meetings and voting only in the event of a tie. The mayor can veto ordinances subject to an override by a two-thirds majority vote of the council. The mayor makes committee and liaison assignments for council members, and most appointments are made by the mayor with the advice and consent of the council.

, the Mayor of Peapack-Gladstone is Independent Gregory Skinner, whose term of office ends December 31, 2022. Members of the Borough Council are Council President Mark A. Corigliano (R, 2022), GianPaolo Caminiti (R, 2022), Amy Dietrich (D, 2023), Donald Lemma (R, 2023), Jamie Murphy (D, 2024), and John Sweeney (R, 2024).

Borough offices are located at the former school building, in the same facility as the local library and police department. Municipal court is shared with Bedminster and Bernardsville. Court sessions are held in Bedminster.

Federal, state and county representation
Peapack-Gladstone is located in the 7th Congressional District and is part of New Jersey's 23rd state legislative district. Prior to the 2011 reapportionment following the 2010 Census, Peapack-Gladstone had been in the 16th state legislative district.

 

Somerset County is governed by a five-member Board of County Commissioners, whose members are elected at-large to three-year terms of office on a staggered basis, with one or two seats coming up for election each year. At an annual reorganization meeting held on the first Friday of January, the board selects a Director and Deputy Director from among its members. , Somerset County's County Commissioners are
Director Shanel Robinson (D, Franklin Township, term as commissioner ends December 31, 2024; term as director ends 2022),
Deputy Director Melonie Marano (D, Green Brook Township, term as commissioner and as deputy director ends 2022),
Paul Drake (D, Hillsborough Township, 2023),
Douglas Singleterry (D, North Plainfield, 2023) and 
Sara Sooy (D, Basking Ridge in Bernards Township, 2024).
Pursuant to Article VII Section II of the New Jersey State Constitution, each county in New Jersey is required to have three elected administrative officials known as constitutional officers. These officers are the County Clerk and County Surrogate (both elected for five-year terms of office) and the County Sheriff (elected for a three-year term). Constitutional officers, elected on a countywide basis are 
County Clerk Steve Peter (D, Somerville, 2022),
Sheriff Darrin Russo (D, Franklin Township, 2022) and 
Surrogate Bernice "Tina" Jalloh (D, Franklin Township, 2025)

Politics
As of March 23, 2011, there were a total of 1,743 registered voters in Peapack & Gladstone, of which 283 (16.2% vs. 26.0% countywide) were registered as Democrats, 957 (54.9% vs. 25.7%) were registered as Republicans and 502 (28.8% vs. 48.2%) were registered as Unaffiliated. There was one voter registered to another party. Among the borough's 2010 Census population, 67.5% (vs. 60.4% in Somerset County) were registered to vote, including 91.8% of those ages 18 and over (vs. 80.4% countywide).

In the 2012 presidential election, Republican Mitt Romney received 62.3% of the vote (796 cast), ahead of Democrat Barack Obama with 36.3% (464 votes), and other candidates with 1.4% (18 votes), among the 1,279 ballots cast by the borough's 1,865 registered voters (1 ballot was spoiled), for a turnout of 68.6%. In the 2008 presidential election, Republican John McCain received 790 votes (58.6% vs. 46.1% countywide), ahead of Democrat Barack Obama with 526 votes (39.0% vs. 52.1%) and other candidates with 21 votes (1.6% vs. 1.1%), among the 1,349 ballots cast by the borough's 1,681 registered voters, for a turnout of 80.2% (vs. 78.7% in Somerset County). In the 2004 presidential election, Republican George W. Bush received 860 votes (65.4% vs. 51.5% countywide), ahead of Democrat John Kerry with 430 votes (32.7% vs. 47.2%) and other candidates with 18 votes (1.4% vs. 0.9%), among the 1,314 ballots cast by the borough's 1,566 registered voters, for a turnout of 83.9% (vs. 81.7% in the whole county).

In the 2013 gubernatorial election, Republican Chris Christie received 79.2% of the vote (662 cast), ahead of Democrat Barbara Buono with 19.3% (161 votes), and other candidates with 1.6% (13 votes), among the 847 ballots cast by the borough's 1,924 registered voters (11 ballots were spoiled), for a turnout of 44.0%. In the 2009 gubernatorial election, Republican Chris Christie received 657 votes (64.9% vs. 55.8% countywide), ahead of Democrat Jon Corzine with 205 votes (20.3% vs. 34.1%), Independent Chris Daggett with 140 votes (13.8% vs. 8.7%) and other candidates with 5 votes (0.5% vs. 0.7%), among the 1,012 ballots cast by the borough's 1,712 registered voters, yielding a 59.1% turnout (vs. 52.5% in the county).

Education
Students in public school for pre-kindergarten through twelfth grade attend the schools of the Somerset Hills Regional School District, a regional school district serving students from Bernardsville, Far Hills and Peapack-Gladstone, along with those from Bedminster who attend the district's high school as part of a sending/receiving relationship. As of the 2020–21 school year, the district, comprised of three schools, had an enrollment of 1,797 students and 155.3 classroom teachers (on an FTE basis), for a student–teacher ratio of 11.6:1. Schools in the district (with 2020–21 enrollment data from the National Center for Education Statistics) are 
Marion T. Bedwell Elementary School with 471 students in grades Pre-K–4, 
Bernardsville Middle School with 474 students in grades 5–8 and 
Bernards High School with 819 students in grades 9–12. The district's board of education is comprised of nine elected members (plus one appointed member representing Bedminster) who set policy and oversee the fiscal and educational operation of the district through its administration. The nine elected seats on the board are allocated to the constituent municipalities based on population, with two seats allocated to Peapack-Gladstone.

Gill St. Bernard's School is a private, nonsectarian, coeducational day school, serving students in pre-kindergarten through twelfth grade. The Cottage School and Cottage Elementary Schools serve students in preschool through the early elementary grades.

Transportation

Roads and highways

U.S. Route 206 is the most prominent highway directly serving the borough, connecting to points north and south. County Route 512 also serves the borough, extending east–west through the area. Interstate 287 and Interstate 78 are both accessible in neighboring Bedminster.

Public transportation

NJ Transit's Gladstone station is the terminus of the Gladstone Branch of the Morris and Essex Lines, taking many of the borough's commuters to Hoboken and New York Penn Station in Midtown Manhattan daily. Peapack has its own station  before the terminus.

Notable people

People who were born in, residents of, or otherwise closely associated with Peapack-Gladstone include:

 Charles E. Apgar (1865–1950), business executive and amateur radio operator best known for making early recordings of coded German radio transmissions at the start of World War I
 Phillip R. Bennett (born 1948), convicted financial fraudster
 C. Ledyard Blair (1867–1949), investment banker and yachtsman
 Susane Colasanti (born 1973), author of realistic, contemporary teen novels
 William R. Cox (1901–1988), prolific writer of short stories and Western and mystery novels mainly for the pulp and paperback markets written under multiple pseudonyms
 Meg Donnelly (born 2000), actress who appeared in the ABC sitcom American Housewife and in the 2018 Disney Channel Original Movie Zombies and its 2020 sequel, Zombies 2
 Jason Gore (born 1974), PGA Tour professional golfer who is the Senior Director of Player Relations for the United States Golf Association
 Hassan II of Morocco (1929–1999), King of Morocco
 Thomas Kiernan (1933-2003), writer who was the author of a biographies that featured figures including Laurence Olivier, Jane Fonda, John Steinbeck, and Yasser Arafat.
 Kate Macy Ladd (1863–1945), philanthropist who founded and endowed the Josiah Macy Jr. Foundation in honor of her father
 Jacqueline Kennedy Onassis (1929–1994), former First Lady of the United States
 Holly Ponichtera, immunologist who competed as a figure skater at Dartmouth College
 Orin R. Smith, former chairman and CEO of Engelhard Corporation
 Richard B. Sellars (1915–2010), Chairman and CEO of Johnson & Johnson
 Kate Whitman Annis (born ), general manager of the Metropolitan Riveters of the National Women's Hockey League

References

External links

 Borough of Peapack-Gladstone official site
 Somerset Hills School District
 
 Natirar History – Mr. Local History Project
 Mr Local History Peapack Articles
 Blairsden Estate History and Tales – Peapack, New Jersey
 Data for the Somerset Hills School District, National Center for Education Statistics
 Peapack-Gladstone Open Space Trust
 The Historical Society of the Somerset Hills
 Stronghold Soccer Club
 The Cottage School and Cottage Elementary School

 
1912 establishments in New Jersey
Borough form of New Jersey government
Boroughs in Somerset County, New Jersey
Populated places established in 1912